Georgios Kalafatis Sports Center is  the training ground and academy base of the Greek football club Panathinaikos since 2013.

In 2013, Giannis Alafouzos, president of Panathinaikos FC, decided the move of the club from the previous training center of Paiania to a new one, owned by the team. The ground was bought by the previous owner, Panionios F.C., and was named "Georgios Kalafatis" in honour of the founder of Panathinaikos.

Since then, it has been a gradual upgrade of the facilities.

Facilities  
 Fully refurbished and equipped gymnasium, Performance Lab, rehabilitation and physiotherapy room
 Restaurant for the athletes and the coaches, bar, lounge, recreation hall, dressing rooms, athletes accommodation, medical facilities, Academy and administration offices
 Professional team offices, meeting room and lounge
 Two floodlight football fields with natural grass turf
 Two floodlight football fields
 Three floodlight 5x5 fields
 One goalkeepers training area
 Tennis court
 Parking area
 Subsidiary offices

References

External links
wikimapia

Panathinaikos F.C.
Georgios Kalafatis